KCIR (90.7 FM) is a radio station broadcasting a Contemporary Christian format. Licensed to Twin Falls, Idaho, United States, the station serves the Twin Falls (Sun Valley) area. The station is currently owned by Faith Communications Corp.

Translators

References

External links

Contemporary Christian radio stations in the United States
Radio stations established in 1984
1984 establishments in Idaho
CIR